Divines is a 2016 drama film directed by Houda Benyamina. It was screened in the Directors' Fortnight section at the 2016 Cannes Film Festival. At Cannes, Houda Benyamina won the Caméra d'Or. The film also was an official selection of the Toronto International Film Festival in the Discovery section. It was released on Netflix worldwide (except in France) on 18 November 2016.

Plot
Dounia is a teenage girl living in a Romani banlieue on the outskirts of Paris with her mother and aunt. She and her best friend Maimouna hustle for money, shoplifting from supermarkets and then reselling their wares on the streets to their classmates. The two girls have a secret hiding place in the catwalk of a local theatre where they observe dance auditions. Djigui, an untrained dancer, catches Dounia's eye. One day, Maimouna dares Dounia to spit on him and she does, resulting in him trying to chase her down. He ends up slipping and Dounia rescues him by pulling him up from the catwalk.

At school, Dounia is expected to be trained as a receptionist. She rebels against her teacher, ridiculing her for her lack of money and vowing to earn more money than her teacher could ever dream of. Rebecca, a local drug dealer, shows the kids a video from a trip to Thailand and plans to move there for the growing sex tourism. Determined to be part of Rebecca's gang, Dounia observes her giving drugs to a dealer, Samir. She steals the drugs from a hiding spot and brings them to Rebecca, telling her that she would do a better job as a dealer. Impressed, Rebecca agrees to let Dounia start working for her.

Rebecca gives Dounia and Maimouna a series of odd jobs which they successfully complete, working up the ranks from chores to dealing drugs. Rebecca confides in the two that a rich man, Reda, keeps 100,000 euros in his apartment, and plans for Dounia to steal it. Dounia continues to hide her money in the theatre but when it is gone she confronts Djigui, who refuses to give it back.

Samir drives Dounia and Maimouna go to a nightclub and succeed in getting the mark to notice Dounia. When they leave, they find that Samir has left; when she gets home, Dounia finds Samir having sex with her mother. She scolds her mother, then burns Samir's mother's car. When the firefighters show up Dounia throws glass bottles at them and starts a riot, leading her to be arrested. At the station, Maimouna and Dounia are loudly berated by Maimouna's devout Muslim parents and an angry Rebecca scolds Dounia for getting in trouble with the police.

Dounia goes to Djigui to get her money back in order to gain back Rebecca's favor. Djigui tells her he has been hired as the principal dancer in the show and gives her tickets to watch him perform, along with the money. Instead of going to see him, Dounia goes with Reda to a club. He takes her to his apartment and when he leaves to take a shower Dounia begins searching for his secret cache of money. She is discovered by Reda, who savagely beats her before attempting to rape her. Dounia fights back, knocking out Reda and then manages to locate the money. She leaves some of the money with her mother and hides some for Maimouna, intending to leave on a dance tour with Djigui.

Before she can go she receives a message from Rebecca who is holding Maimouna hostage until Dounia returns. Dounia brings the money to Rebecca, but she notices that some of it is missing and douses Dounia with gasoline, threatening to burn her. Before she can Samir realizes that the money is at her mother's home and leaves to go get it. Enraged, Dounia attacks Rebecca before she throws a lighter and the room they are in catches fire with them locked inside. Maimouna is able to open a vent but is unable to go through. Rebecca escapes and Maimouna urges Dounia to leave as her face is covered in gasoline. The money they were fighting over burns behind them. The firemen arrive in time, but wait outside as they are not allowed to fight fires in the neighbourhood anymore without the presence of riot police. Dounia begs them to save her friend, but they are unmoved, and the building explodes, killing Maimouna. An inconsolable Dounia watches a riot unfold as the police arrive.

Cast 

 Oulaya Amamra as Dounia
 Déborah Lukumuena as Maimouna
 Kévin Mischel as Djigui
 Jisca Kalvanda as Rebecca
 Yasin Houicha as Samir
 Majdouline Idrissi as Myriam
 Mounir Margoum as Cassandra
 Farid Larbi as Reda

Awards and accolades

References

External links
 
 
 Divines on Cineuropa
 Divines on UniFrance
 Divines on France 2 Cinéma 

2016 films
2016 crime drama films
2010s female buddy films
2010s buddy drama films
2010s teen drama films
2016 directorial debut films
French crime drama films
Hood films
2010s French-language films
Best First Feature Film César Award winners
Caméra d'Or winners
Films featuring a Best Supporting Actress César Award-winning performance
Films set in Paris
Films shot in Paris
French female buddy films
French teen drama films
French buddy drama films
2010s American films
2010s French films